Y-O-U is the first album by Atlanta rock band Y-O-U. Released in 2003, it is their only album with members Eric Harlan Park and Matt Sonnicksen, who left the band approximately a year later.

The sole writing and producing credits for the album go to the band as a whole.

Track listing
 "Radio" - 2:58
 "LA Lindsay" - 4:24
 "Easy" - 3:16
 "Hold Me" - 2:15
 "Moviekiss" - 5:50
 "Good Intentions" - 2:34
 "Heart That Remains" - 3:24
 "Wings" - 3:08
 "Back with Him" - 3:03
 "How to Say Goodbye" - 4:00

Music videos
"Radio"
Dir: Jon Danovic
Feat: Josh Rifkind as "Coach Adair"
Billed as part 3 of mockumentary The Flying Wallabies

"LA Lindsay"
Dir: The Brothers Chaps
Animated in Macromedia Flash
Features animals representing each band member

"Easier"
Dir: Y-O-U
Song is 3-man version of "Easy" recorded after Sonnicksen and Park left the band
Video is photo slideshow featuring all 5 members

"Hold Me"
Dir: Peter Sobat
First Y-O-U video created

"Moviekiss"
Dir: Jon Danovic
Video is about the band filming a video for "Moviekiss"

"Heart That Remains"
Dir: Peter Sobat
Video includes onscreen dialogue and introduces "The Skinny" dance.

Personnel
Y-O-U: Nick Niespodziani, Peter Olson, Mark Cobb, Matt Sonnicksen, Eric Harlan Park
Producer: Y-O-U
Engineer: Kristofer Sampson
Mixer: Don McCollister
Additional mixing: Kristofer Sampson
Mastering: Jeff Lipton
Photography: Joseph Guay
Art Design & Layout: Kristofer Sampson, Kartouche

2003 albums
Y-O-U albums